The Roman Catholic  Diocese of Mazatlán is a suffragan diocese of the Archdiocese of Durango. It was erected in 1958 and, along with the archdiocese, lost territory in 1968 to form the Territorial Prelature of El Salto.

Ordinaries
Miguel Garcia Franco (1958 -1981) 
Rafael Barraza Sánchez (1981 -2005)
Mario Espinosa Contreras (2005 - )

Episcopal See
Mazatlán, Sinaloa

See also
Cathedral Basilica of the Immaculate Conception, Mazatlán

External links and references

Mazatlan
Mazatlan, Roman Catholic Diocese of
Mazatlan
Mazatlan
1958 establishments in Mexico